Császló is a village in Szabolcs-Szatmár-Bereg county, in the Northern Great Plain region of eastern Hungary.

Etymology
The name comes from Slavic personal name Čáslav (see also Čáslav, Czech Republic).

Geography

Population

References

Populated places in Szabolcs-Szatmár-Bereg County